The 1924 Texas Longhorns football team represented the University of Texas at Austin in the 1924 college football season.  In their second year under head coach E. J. Stewart.

Schedule

References

Texas
Texas Longhorns football seasons
Texas Longhorns football